François Véron Duverger de Forbonnais (1722–1800) was a French political economist and contributor to the Encyclopédie ou Dictionnaire raisonné des sciences, des arts et des métiers.

Life
François Véron Duverger de Forbonnais was born in Le Mans and educated in Paris. After working for his father's textile business, he settled in Paris and became inspector-general of the French coinage in 1752.

He edited the Journal de l’agriculture, du commerce et des finances in the 1760s, and would help draw up Le Mans' noble Cahier de Doleances in 1789.

Works

 Considérations sur les finances d'Espagne, 1753
 Elémens du commerce, 1754
 Questions sur le commerce des françois au Levant, 1755
 Essai sur l'admission des navires neutres dans nos colonies, 1756
 Recherches et considérations sur les finances de France depuis 1595 jusqu'en 1721, 1758
 Principes et observations oeconomiques'', 1767

References

External links

1722 births
1800 deaths
French economists
Members of the French Academy of Sciences
People from Le Mans
Contributors to the Encyclopédie (1751–1772)
French male non-fiction writers
18th-century French male writers